'Ralls Janet' is an apple cultivar that is also known by many other names. It has been used extensively in modern apple breeding, and has several commercially important offspring. It was grown at Monticello by Thomas Jefferson. 

It has been said that the name derives from Edmond-Charles Genet, a Frenchman who gave cuttings to Jefferson, who then passed them on to Virginia nurseryman Caleb Ralls, but this claim, cited here from 1905, was not made until about 100 years after the apple became known and may not be accurate.

Names
Names and spellings that have been used for this apple cultivar include:
Genet, Geneton, Geniton, Gennetin, Genneting, Ginet, Indiana Janetting, Jefferson Pippin, Jeniton, Jennett, Missouri Janet, Never Fail, Neverfail, Ralls Genet, Raul's Genetting, 
Raule's Genet, Raule's Janet, Raule's Jannating, Rawl's Janet, Rawle's Genet, Red Never Fail, Red Neverfail, Rock Remain, Rock Rimmon, Rockremain, Rockrimmon Rowle's Janet, Royal Janette, Winter Genneting, Winter Jounetting, Yellow Janette.

References

External links
Albemarle CiderWorks, Vintage apples

Apple cultivars